Asla (Arabic: عسلة, from Arabic "Assel", lit. honey) is a municipality in Naâma Province, Algeria. It is coextensive with the district of Asla and has a population of 4,784, which gives it 7 seats in the PMA. Its postal code is 45250 and its municipal code is 4507.

Populated places in Naâma Province